Love, In Between (lit. "Two Women") is a 2010 South Korean film based on the Finnish film Black Ice (2007)..

Plot
Love, In Between centers around a woman who discovers that her husband is having an affair. Prior to this, the couple were nearly perfect and the movie reflects the choices one might make in such a situation.

University professor Yun Ji-seok (Jung Joon-ho) loves his wife So-young (Shin Eun-kyung) who works as an obstetrician, but he cannot give up his new love, a student named Su-ji (Shim Yi-young) he is having an affair with. 

After So-young discovers her husband's affair with a student named Su-ji, So-young embarks an elaborate plot to befriend the woman. When So-young meets Su-ji, she experiences varying emotions from wanting revenge to sympathy.

Cast
 Shin Eun-kyung as Han So-young 
 Jung Joon-ho as Yun Ji-seok 
 Shim Yi-young as Su-ji 
 Choi Jae-won as Yeong-ho
 Lee Seon-jin as Min-seo
 Kwon Sung-min as Jae-hee

Release
The film was released in South Korean cinemas on November 18, 2010. It opened at #8 in the box office selling, 59,424 tickets. In total the film grossed  in South Korea with 129,323 admissions sold nationwide.

References

External links
 https://web.archive.org/web/20130407055251/http://www.twowomen2010.co.kr/ 
 Love, In Between at Naver 
 
 
 

2010 films
2010s Korean-language films
Bisexuality-related films
South Korean erotic romance films
South Korean LGBT-related films
South Korean romantic drama films
Remakes of Finnish films
South Korean remakes of foreign films
2010s South Korean films